The Melon Route is a Croatian drama film directed by Branko Schmidt. It was released in 2006.

Cast
 Krešimir Mikić - Mirko
 Sun Mei - Chinese girl
 Leon Lučev - Seki
 Armin Omerović - Meho
 Emir Hadžihafizbegović - Gojko
 Ivo Gregurević - Cale
 Slobodan Maksimović - Edo
 Zijah Sokolović - Pauk
 Darijo Veličan - Covjek sa paralizom
 Elena Dlesk - Ruskinja #1
 Dora Lipovčan - Ruskinja #2
 Filip Šovagović - Lak
 Iljo Benković Drca - Kolega
 Chen Samin - Stari Kinez

External links
 

2006 films
2000s Croatian-language films
2006 drama films
Films directed by Branko Schmidt
Croatian drama films
Films about immigration